Taihu Town is a town located in the west side of Tongzhou District, Beijing, China. It shares border with Dougezhuang, Heizhuanghu Townships and Liyuan Town in the north, Zhangjiawan Town in the east, Majuqiao Town in the south, Beijing Economic-Technological Development Area in the southwest, Yizhuang Town and Shibalidian Township in the northwest. In 2020, population for the town was 151,735.

The name Taihu comes from Tai Lake within the town, which was formed during the Liao dynasty.

History

Administration divisions 
As of 2021, Taihu Town was subdivided into 47 divisions. 6 of them were communities, while the other 41 were villages:

Economics 
In the year 2018, Taihu Town's total tax revenue was 2.55 billion Chinese Yuan, and the disposable income per capital was ￥30,323.

Gallery

See also 

 List of township-level divisions of Beijing

References 

Towns in Beijing
Tongzhou District, Beijing